The Irving McDonald House at 191 Booker in Tonopah, Nevada, United States, is a historic stone house that was built in 1906.  It was listed on the National Register of Historic Places in 1982.

It was deemed significant for association with businessman and lawyer Irving McDonald and "as a good example of local stone residential construction".

References 

Houses completed in 1906
Houses on the National Register of Historic Places in Nevada
National Register of Historic Places in Tonopah, Nevada
Houses in Nye County, Nevada
1906 establishments in Nevada